Lock up may refer to:

Film and television
 Lock Up (1989 film), an American prison action film featuring Sylvester Stallone
 Lock Up (2020 film), an Indian Tamil-language thriller film
 Lock-Up (TV series), a 1959 American legal drama series
 Lockup (TV series), a prison documentary series on MSNBC
 "Lockup" (Agents of S.H.I.E.L.D.), a 2016 episode of Agents of S.H.I.E.L.D.
 Lock Upp: Badass Jail, Atyaachari Khel!, an Indian reality OTT series

Finance
 Lock-up provision, a corporate finance term
 Lock-up period, a term concerning initial public offerings of stock

Music
 Lock Up (American band), a rock band, featuring guitarist Tom Morello during his pre-Rage Against the Machine career
 Lock Up (British band), a grindcore band
 Lock Up, a BBC radio show hosted by Mike Davies featuring mostly punk associated acts
 Lock Up Stage, a stage at the Reading & Leeds music festival named after the radio show

Prison
 Village lock-up, a small prison once used to detain people temporarily
 Prison cell, used to hold detainees until they are charged

Other
 Hang (computing), often relatedly, 'locked up'
 A self storage facility or other, typically, off-site storage space
 Lock-Up (comics), a character from the Batman comics
 Lock up, particular graphic arrangement of a logo and accompanying elements, such as a company name or a tagline

See also
Garage (house)
The Lock Up (disambiguation)